Sushi Yasuda is a Japanese sushi restaurant located at 204 East 43rd Street (between Second Avenue and Third Avenue) in the Midtown East area of Manhattan, New York City.

The restaurant was founded in 1999 by its former chef, Naomichi Yasuda of Chiba Prefecture, who returned to Japan in January 2011 to open a new restaurant in Tokyo, Sushi Bar Yasuda.  It is owned by Shige Akimoto, and Scott Rosenberg.  The current chef is Mitsuru Tamura.

Menu
Sushi Yasuda usually has five or more variants of tuna available.  Food is served omakase style.

Decor
The stark, minimalist restaurant is lined in simple blond-wood, with high ceilings. Sushi Yasuda uses bamboo on its floor, walls, and ceiling.

Reviews
In 2000, restaurant critic William Grimes of The New York Times gave Sushi Yasuda three stars, and in 2001 he called it "sublime."  In 2011, Eric Asimov of The New York Times gave it three stars, and Bloomberg gave it two and a half stars.

In 2013, Zagat's gave it a food rating of 28, the second-highest in the East 40s, and rated it the 9th-best restaurant in New York City.

See also
 List of Japanese restaurants
 List of restaurants in New York City
 List of sushi restaurants

References

External links

Restaurants in Manhattan
Restaurants established in 1999
Midtown Manhattan
Sushi restaurants in the United States
Japanese-American culture in New York City
Michelin Guide starred restaurants in New York (state)
1999 establishments in New York City
Japanese restaurants in New York (state)